Van Kampen is a Dutch toponymic surname meaning "from Kampen", where Kampen usually refers to Kampen, Overijssel. People with this surname include:

 Claire van Kampen (born 1953), English director, composer and playwright
  (born 1939), Dutch painter, sculptor and draughtsman
 Egbert van Kampen (1908–1942), Dutch mathematician
 He devised the Van Kampen theorem in topology and the Van Kampen diagram in group theory
 Jacob van Campen (1596–1657), Dutch artist and architect 
 Johannes van Kampen (1899–1969), Dutch sprinter
 Judith van Kampen (born 1978), Dutch softball player 
 Michiel van Kampen (born 1976), Dutch baseball player 
 Nico van Kampen (1921–2013), Dutch theoretical physicist
 He pioneered the Van Kampen's expansion, technique in the analysis of stochastic processes
 Nicolaas Godfried van Kampen (1776–1839), Dutch Mennonite author and deacon
 Paul van Kampen, singer and musician in the rock band Beija Flor
 Pieter Nicolaas van Kampen (1878–1937), Dutch zoologist
 Robert Van Kampen (1938–1999), American businessman and Christian fundamentalist
 Robin van Kampen (born 1994), Dutch chess grandmaster and prodigy
 Stephen van Kampen, singer and musician in the rock band Beija Flor

See also
 Van Campen
 Van Kampen Investments, an American mutual fund company established by Robert Van Kampen
 Van Kempen

References

Dutch-language surnames
Surnames of Dutch origin
Toponymic surnames